National Historic District may refer to:

 National Historic Landmark District, a district officially recognized by the United States government for its national-level historical significance
 National Historic Sites of Canada, places designated by Canada's federal Minister of the Environment as being of national historic significance
 National Register of Historic Places historic district, in the United States a place listed as a National Register of Historic Places property type

See also
 Historic district, a section of a city considered valuable for historical or architectural reasons